Behailu Demeke Teshome (born 31 October 1984) is an Ethiopian footballer who plays as a midfielder for SpVgg Leusel.

Career
Demeke started his career with Ethiopian side Awassa City, helping them win their first league title. Before the second half of 2013–14, he signed for SV Müs in the German eighth tier. Before the second half of 2014–15, Demeke signed for German seventh tier club FSG Homberg/Ober-Ofleiden. 

In 2017, he returned to FSG Kirtorf in the German tenth tier, helping them earn promotion to the German ninth tier. In 2020, he signed for German eighth tier team Spvgg. Leusel.

References

External links
 

Living people
1984 births
Ethiopian footballers
Association football midfielders
Ethiopia international footballers
Ethiopian Premier League players
Hawassa City S.C. players
Ethiopian expatriate footballers
Ethiopian expatriate sportspeople in Germany
Expatriate footballers in Germany